Joseph Desmond Caprani (27 May 1920 – 16 July 2015) was an Irish cricketer. A right-handed batsman he made his debut for Ireland in June 1948 against Yorkshire and went on to play for them seven times in all, including five first-class matches. His last game was against Scotland in June 1960.

After retiring as a player, he became an umpire, umpiring a match between Ireland and Scotland in 1975. He also served as president of the Irish Cricket Union in 1983.

References

2015 deaths
1920 births
Irish cricketers
Cricketers from County Dublin
Irish cricket coaches